The 1988 2. divisjon was a Norwegian second-tier football league season.

The league was contested by 24 teams, divided into two groups; A and B. The winners of group A and B were promoted to the 1989 1. divisjon. The second placed teams met the 10th position finisher in the 1. divisjon in a qualification round where the winner was promoted to 1. divisjon. The bottom three teams in both groups were relegated to the 3. divisjon.

Overview

Summary
Viking won group A with 45 points and Mjølner won group B with 53 points. Both teams promoted to the 1989 1. divisjon. The second-placed teams, Start and HamKam met Bryne in the promotion play-offs. Start won the qualification and was promoted to the 1. divisjon.

Tables

Group A

Group B

Promotion play-offs

Results
 Start – HamKam 2–1
 HamKam – Bryne 2–1
 Djerv 1919 – Start 1–3

Start won the qualification round and won promotion to the 1. divisjon.

Play-off table

References

Norwegian First Division seasons
1988 in Norwegian football
Norway
Norway